RFO may refer to:

 RF Online, a multiplayer online role-playing computer game
 Radio Frequency Overlay, analogue Cable TV over a GPON optical network
 Réseau France Outre-mer, a network of radio and television stations operating in French overseas departments and territories
 Range Forest Officer, similar to a forest ranger in the U.S.
Forest Range Officer, similar title in India
 Read For Ownership, an operation in computer cache coherency protocols
 Republicans for Obama
 Request for offer
 Residual fuel oil, a heavy product from oil refineries
 Reason For Outage, a term related to network outage in system administration
 Restrictive flow orifice, a tool to limit the danger of uncontrolled flow, for example, in a compressed gas cylinder
 Ready for operation
 Robert-Falcon Ouellette (born 1979), Canadian politician